Ali Shaukat (October 6, 1897 – February 25, 1960) was an Indian field hockey player who competed in the 1928 Summer Olympics.

He was a member of the Indian field hockey team, which won the gold medal. He played three matches as forward and scored two goals.

References

External links
 

1897 births
1960 deaths
Indian Muslims
Olympic field hockey players of India
Field hockey players at the 1928 Summer Olympics
Indian male field hockey players
Olympic gold medalists for India
Olympic medalists in field hockey
Medalists at the 1928 Summer Olympics
Indian emigrants to Pakistan